Port Gibson is a former community in Gibson County, Indiana, in the United States.

History
Port Gibson was platted in 1852 when the Wabash and Erie Canal was extended to that point. It declined shortly thereafter with the advent of the railroad.

A post office was established at Port Gibson in 1852, and remained in operation until it was discontinued in 1863.

References

Geography of Gibson County, Indiana
1852 establishments in Indiana